Holtriem is a Samtgemeinde ("collective municipality") in the district of Wittmund, in Lower Saxony, Germany. It is situated near the North Sea coast, approx. 20 km west of Wittmund, and 13 km north of Aurich. Its seat is in the village Westerholt.

The Samtgemeinde Holtriem consists of the following municipalities:

 Blomberg 
 Eversmeer 
 Nenndorf 
 Neuschoo 
 Ochtersum 
 Schweindorf 
 Utarp 
 Westerholt 

Samtgemeinden in Lower Saxony
Towns and villages in East Frisia